Clemencia Ignatia Johanna Maria (Clémence) Ross-van Dorp (born 27 August 1957, in Delft) is a Dutch politician.

References

1957 births
Living people
Dutch sinologists
Dutch educators
Dutch football chairmen and investors
Dutch sports executives and administrators
State Secretaries for Health of the Netherlands
Members of the House of Representatives (Netherlands)
Christian Democratic Appeal politicians
People from Delft
Leiden University alumni
Academic staff of Leiden University